Torre del Rocadillo is a historic ruined tower, located about a mile to the west of Puente Mayorga in the municipality of San Roque in the Province of Cádiz, Andalusia, Spain.
It was constructed in the 16th century.

References

Towers in Spain
Buildings and structures in San Roque, Cádiz
Bien de Interés Cultural landmarks in the Province of Cádiz